Alioune Badara Mbengue  (1 February 1924 – 12 November 1992) was a Senegalese  politician. He served as Foreign Minister of Senegal in 1968.

References

Babacar Ndiaye et Waly Ndiaye, Présidents et ministres de la République du Sénégal, Dakar, 2006 (2e éd.)

Senegalese politicians
Foreign ministers of Senegal
1924 births
1992 deaths